Maurice Raizman (né Miron Raizman) (26 February 1905, Bendery – 1 April 1974, Paris) was a French chess master.

Born into a Jewish family in Bendery (then in Russian Empire), he emigrated to France. He was six-times French Champion (1932, 1936, 1946, 1947, 1951, and 1952) and Paris Champion in 1938. 
He shared first with Victor Kahn in 16th Paris Championship 1934, and tied for 1st-2nd with Aristide Gromer in 17th French Championship at Nice 1938. He took 2nd, behind Stepan Popel, in the Paris Championship 1953.

Raizman played for France in Chess Olympiads:
 In 1935, at first reserve board in 6th Chess Olympiad in Warsaw (+4 –4 =8);
 In 1954, at second board in 11th Chess Olympiad in Amsterdam (+5 –6 =5);
 In 1958, at first board in 13th Chess Olympiad in Munich (+1 –7 =5);
 In 1972, at first reserve board in 20th Chess Olympiad in Skopje (+8 –1 =1).

References 

1905 births
1974 deaths
People from Bender, Moldova
People from Bendersky Uyezd
Bessarabian Jews
Moldovan Jews
Romanian emigrants to France
Jewish chess players
Moldovan chess players
French chess players
20th-century chess players